Medved is the name of several rural localities in Novgorod Oblast, Russia:
Medved, Malovishersky District, Novgorod Oblast, a village in Burginskoye Settlement of Malovishersky District
Medved, Shimsky District, Novgorod Oblast, a selo in Medvedskoye Settlement of Shimsky District